Hasti is a 1993  Bollywood film directed by Ashok Gaekwad and produced by Sandeep D. Shinde. It stars Naseeruddin Shah, Jackie Shroff, Nagma and Varsha Usgaonkar in pivotal roles.

Plot
Narang is an accomplished and wealthy industrialist who lives with his daughter, Neena, in a palatial home. His daughter is now of marriageable age, and he would like her to marry his associate, Bhisham's, son, Vicky. But Neena is in love with a much poorer man named Jaikishan, alias Jaggu. When Neena informs her father that she would like to marry Jaggu, he summons Jaggu's mom, Shanti, and instantly recognizes her from his questionable past. He belittles her, humiliates her and asks her to leave his house. When Jaggu finds out he goes to meet Narang, and asks him to change his decision, but he too gets insulted, and is asked to leave, never to see nor speak to Neena again. Jaggu promises him that he will return within one year and by that time he will be even more wealthy than Narang. Jaggu befriends a homeless man named Vishal and together they set forth to meet Jaggu's deadline. Things are going pretty well for Jaggu, as he has been able to get a sizable loan from a bank, and has started his own construction business. This success has got him enemies, and one day someone places a bomb in his car. Jaggu survives, but is critically wounded and in need of blood. His blood group is the same as that of Vishal - but Vishal refuses to give any blood to save Jaggu. Shanti is shocked and appalled at this, and sets forth to find out why her son's closest friend refuses to help him in this dire time of need.

Cast
Naseeruddin Shah as Vishal
Jackie Shroff as Jaikishan
Nagma as Neena Narang
Varsha Usgaonkar as Anita "Anu"
Aruna Irani as Shanti
Sadashiv Amrapurkar as Narang
Shafi Inamdar as Bhisham
Gulshan Grover as Vicky, Bhisham's son.
Achyut Potdar as Contractor Ahluwalia 
Anant Jog as Dr Vinay
Vikas Anand as Mehta
Rakesh Bedi as Changu
Rajesh Puri as Mangu
Laxmikant Berde as Pasinger
Gurbachchan Singh as Jagavar

Soundtrack

References

External links

1990s Hindi-language films
1993 films
Films scored by Anand–Milind